Presidential elections in South Korea determine who will serve as the President of South Korea for the next five years (formerly four, six, and seven).

Since the establishment of the First Republic in 1948, the presidential elections have taken place 21 times (20 excluding the March 1960 election whose results were invalidated after the April Revolution): in 1948, 1952, 1956, 1960 (in March and August), 1963, 1967, 1971, 1972, 1978, 1979, 1980, 1981, 1987, 1992, 1997, 2002, 2007, 2012, 2017, and 2022.

Prior to the Presidential Election Act of 1987, the elections were indirect. Since 1987, the president is elected directly by the public in a single round plurality vote (using the first-past-the-post simple plurality system) for a single, non-renewable five-year term.

Procedure (1987–present) 
The presidential election rules are defined by the South Korean Constitution and the Public Official Election Act.

Election campaign 
The election campaign period, as set by the Election Law, is short – 23 days. According to the book Internet Election Campaigns in the United States, Japan, South Korea, and Taiwan, the election campaign periods in Korea (23 days for presidential elections and 14 days for National Assembly elections) were made intentionally short in order to "prevent excessive campaign spending for long-running election campaigns and harmful effects from overheated elections", but, on the downside, "this works against new candidates who are not well known".

Popular vote 
The president is elected by direct popular vote, It is conducted in a single round on a first-past-the-post basis.

Summary of past presidential elections 

Winning party ideology:

See also 
 Elections in South Korea

References